The Human Face is a 4-part BBC series that examines the science behind facial beauty, expression, and fame. Actor and comedian John Cleese investigated identity, perception, creativity and sexuality and their relation to the human face, combining art, technology and human interest stories. Paul Ekman served as scientific adviser.

Plot

Part One: Face to Face
Original airdate: 7 March 2001

This episode looks at how the face communicates without speech, focusing on expressions, disguise and the mysterious art of face-reading.

Part Two: Here’s Looking at You!
Original airdate: 14 March 2001

This episode investigates family resemblances, facial recognition and the purpose of the face and its features, going back to five hundred million years ago. It also speculates about the multi-racial face of the future and showed surgeons in Kentucky preparing for the world's first facial transplant.

Part Three: Beauty
Original airdate: 21 March 2001

This episode studies whether human physical attractiveness is a matter of personal taste, looking at standards of beauty that are shared worldwide: a pretty face suggests fertility, while ugliness suggests poor health. Big eyes, smooth skin and symmetrical features are valued, and can lead to a better job, more money, and better sex.

Part Four: Fame
Original airdate: 25 March 2001

This episode looks at the ubiquity of famous faces on billboards, magazines, and movie screens, and the messages they carry about sex, politics, glamour and power. Considering Diana, Princess of Wales, Jackie Onassis, Marilyn Monroe, it tells the story of the face as icon, from Egyptian mummies to Hollywood stars.

Cast
 John Cleese as himself (Host)
 Elizabeth Hurley as Various roles
 David Attenborough as himself
 Candice Bergen as herself
 Pierce Brosnan as himself
 Mali Finn as herself
 Charles Fleming as himself
 William Goldman as himself
 Kevyn Major Howard as himself
 Michael Palin as Applicant/peasant
 Dr. Vilayanur Ramachandran as himself
 Vail Reese as himself
 Joan Rivers as herself
 Michael Rix as himself
 Prunella Scales as Pet shop owner/wife
 Carrie Armel as herself
 David Matsumoto as himself
 Cynthia Breazeal as herself
 Dacher Keltner as himself
 Victoria Wright as herself
 John Gottman as himself
 Paul Ekman as himself
 Ronald Zuker as himself
 Paul Nassif as himself
 Lisa Fuerst as herself
 Mitchell Fuerst as himself
 Jim Cooke as himself
 Cindy Cooke as herself
 Tommy Cooke as himself
 Dr. Keith Kendrick as himself
 Tim Watts as himself
 David Rodriguez as himself
 Rosita Rodriguez as herself
 Jennifer Thompson as herself
 Mike Gauldin as himself
 Dr. Michelle de Haan as herself
 Sarah Doukas as herself
 Dr. Stephen Marquardt as himself
 Dr. David Buss as himself
 Zara Brocklesby as herself
 Dr. John Manning as himself
 Henry de Lotbiniere as himself
 Rick Edwards as himself
 Ryan Martin as himself
 Michael Ricks as himself
 Jeanne Magagna as herself
 Dr. Bruce Charlton as himself
 Roger Hargreaves as himself
 Krista Smith as herself

References

External links
 
 
 
 

BBC television documentaries
2001 television films
2001 films
Facial expressions
British documentary films
British television documentaries
Biographical documentary films
Works by John Cleese
Documentary films about the human body
2000s English-language films
2000s British films